Too Dangerous to Live is a 1939 British crime film directed by Anthony Hankey and Leslie 
Norman and starring Sebastian Shaw, Anna Konstam and Reginald Tate. It was based on the novel Crime Unlimited by David Hume.

Premise
A private detective goes undercover by joining a gang of burglars.

Cast
 Sebastian Shaw as Jacques Leclerc
 Anna Konstam as Lou
 Reginald Tate as Collins
 Greta Gynt as Marjorie
 Ronald Adam as Murbridge / Wills
 Edward Lexy as Inspector Cardby
 Ian McLean as Saunders
 Henry Caine as Selford
 George Relph as Manners
 Toni Edgar-Bruce as Mrs. Herbert
 Torin Thatcher as Burton
 William Hartnell as Minor role

References

External links

1939 films
1939 crime films
British black-and-white films
British crime films
1930s English-language films
1930s British films